Steven Paul Logan (born December 23, 1965) is an American lawyer and judge serving as a United States district judge of the United States District Court for the District of Arizona. He is a former United States magistrate judge of the same court.

Education and military service

Logan received a Bachelor of Science degree from the University of Louisville. He received his Juris Doctor from the University of Oklahoma College of Law. After twenty-six years of service, Colonel Logan retired from the United States Marine Corps. He served two combat tours of duty in Iraq and one combat tour of duty in Afghanistan. He was awarded the Bronze Star Medal and Combat Action Ribbon for combat operations during his second tour of duty in Iraq.

Legal and judicial service

From 1999 to 2010, Logan served as an Assistant United States Attorney with the United States Department of Justice. As a Federal Prosecutor, he was a member of the Organized Crime Drug Enforcement Task Force (OCDETF) unit. He was responsible for prosecuting national and international drug trafficking and racketeering organizations. From 2010 to 2012, he served as a United States Immigration Judge in the District of Arizona. From January 2012 until May 16, 2014 he served as a United States magistrate judge in the District of Arizona.

Federal judicial service

On September 19, 2013, President Barack Obama nominated Logan to serve as a United States District Judge of the United States District Court for the District of Arizona. Logan was nominated by President Obama after consultation with Republican Senators John McCain and Jeff Flake. On January 27, 2014, Logan appeared in Washington, D.C. before the United States Senate for his confirmation hearing. On February 27, 2014, his nomination was reported out of the committee by a voice vote. On May 12, 2014 Senate Majority Leader Harry Reid filed for cloture on the nomination. On Wednesday May 14, 2014  the Senate voted on the motion to invoke cloture by a 58–37 vote. Later that day, the United States Senate unanimously confirmed his nomination by a 96–0 vote. Logan received his judicial commission on May 16, 2014.

See also 
 List of African-American federal judges
 List of African-American jurists

References

External links

1965 births
Living people
African-American judges
Assistant United States Attorneys
Arizona lawyers
Judges of the United States District Court for the District of Arizona
United States Department of Justice officials
United States district court judges appointed by Barack Obama
21st-century American judges
United States magistrate judges
United States Marine Corps reservists
University of Louisville alumni
University of Oklahoma College of Law alumni